Anthony Middleton (died 1590) was an English Roman Catholic priest and martyr from Yorkshire. He trained at Douai College, and returned to England in 1586. He was captured by Richard Topcliffe in Fleet Street, London, close to where he was hanged, drawn and quartered with Edward Jones on 6 May 1590. 

He was beatified on 15 December 1929 and his feast day is 6 May.

See also
 Catholic Church in the United Kingdom
 Douai Martyrs

References

Year of birth missing
1590 deaths
16th-century English Roman Catholic priests
English beatified people
People executed under Elizabeth I by hanging, drawing and quartering
Executed English people
One Hundred and Seven Martyrs of England and Wales